Alberto Estima de Oliveira (July 1, 1934 – May 1, 2008) was a Portuguese poet. He was born in Lisbon, moved to Benguela, Angola in 1957, and later to Guinea Bissau. He lived in Macao from 1982 to 2004.

Selected works
Vector II
Vector III
Kuzuela III – 1.ª Antologia de Poesia Africana de Espressão Portuguesa
Tempo de Angústia (Angola, 1972)
Infraestructuras (Macao, 1987)
Diálogo do Silêncio (Macao, 1988)
Rosto (Macao, 1990)
Corpo (Con)Sentido (Macao, 1993)
Esqueleto do Tempo (Macao, 1995)
O Sentir (Macao, 1996)
 Infraestruturas (Kei Tcho) (Macau, 1999) (bilingual Portuguese, Chinese)
MESOPOTAMIA – espaço que criei (Lisboa, 2003)

Awards

1999: INTERNATIONAL GRAND PRIZE FOR POETRY at ''The International Festival “Curtea de Arges Poetry Nights”, Romania

References

1934 births
2008 deaths
21st-century Portuguese poets
Portuguese male poets
People from Lisbon
20th-century Portuguese poets
20th-century male writers
21st-century male writers